Mallampeta is a village in Kakinada district of the Indian state of Andhra Pradesh. It is located in Rowthulapudi Mandal.

Geography
Mallampeta is located in the east part of India. It has an average elevation of 150 metres (1067 ft).

Demographics
Mallampeta's total population is 2658; 53% male and 47% female.

References

Villages in Rowthulapudi mandal